Kevin Ellison (born 23 February 1979) is an English professional footballer who plays as a winger for Northern Premier League Division One West club City of Liverpool.

He has represented fourteen clubs during his career, making in excess of 550 appearances in the Football League; including 350 games for Morecambe. Ellison also played once in the Premier League for Leicester City. He also played in the Football League for Stockport County, Lincoln City, Chester City, Hull City, Rotherham United, Bradford City and Newport County. He has featured semi-professionally for Southport, Chorley, Conwy United, Altrincham and Warrington Rylands.

During the 2019–20 season, Ellison briefly acted as a coach for Morecambe.

Career

Early career
Born in Liverpool, Ellison started his career in non-league football, playing for Southport, Chorley, Conwy United and Altrincham. In February 2001 he joined Leicester City for a £50,000 fee. At Leicester he made his only appearance as a late substitute against Manchester United at Old Trafford. He later joined Stockport County. In 2004, he was loaned out to Lincoln City. In August 2004 he was transferred to Chester City.

Ellison signed for Hull City in January 2005 for a £100,000 fee. Despite a solid work rate he often struggled for form and was regularly in the shadow of Stuart Elliott, the Tigers' most outstanding left winger of recent times. Ellison did score an individual goal away at Southampton in a 1–1 draw and was part of the 2004–05 team that gained promotion from the third tier to the Championship. In June 2006, Hull accepted £100,000 for the player from Scunthorpe United, though Ellison refused the move. Instead he joined Tranmere Rovers for an undisclosed fee. In June 2007 he moved on to Chester City for £150,000, signing a three-year contract.

His first league game back at Chester was a goalless draw with Chesterfield on 11 August 2007. In January 2008 Wrexham put in a five-figure offer for the player, though he did not make the move. Stockport County also attempted to win his signature, but were also unsuccessful.

In the 2008–09 Football League Two campaign, Ellison scored a hat-trick for Chester in a 3–1 victory over Grimsby Town on 13 September 2008. He scored 12 other league goals during the season, which still ended with the club being relegated from The Football League. On 11 August 2009, he scored the winning goal as Rotherham upset Championship side Derby County 2–1 in the first round of the Football League Cup.

In February 2011, Ellison was loaned to Rotherham's fellow League Two side Bradford City, with Omar Daley moving in the opposite direction. He scored the only goal of a 1–0 win against Wycombe Wanderers in his Bradford debut.

Morecambe
Ellison was released by Rotherham at the end of the 2010–11 season. On 31 May 2011, Ellison signed for Jim Bentley's Morecambe on a one-year contract.

On 1 January 2012, Ellison signed an extension to his Morecambe contract, which would keep him at the Globe Arena for a further 18 months.

In June 2018 Ellison publicly talked about his struggles with depression, giving advice to fellow professionals. In November 2018, a club-released YouTube video featuring Ellison challenging his online gaming speed stat gained notoriety when it was featured on the sports website Deadspin.

He signed a new one-year contract with Morecambe in June 2019. Following Jim Bentley's departure as manager on 28 October 2019, Ellison assumed the role of caretaker player-manager, alongside Barry Roche. Ellison's only match in charge was the 1–0 home win against Leyton Orient in League Two on 2 November 2019. Derek Adams was appointed Morecambe team manager on 7 November 2019. In June 2020, Ellison was released by Morecambe after 352 league appearances during nine years with the club and having scored 88 goals.

Newport County
On 4 September 2020, Ellison joined fellow League Two side Newport County on a one-year deal. For the 2020–21 season, Newport County appointed Ellison as their 'mental health ambassador'. He made his debut for Newport on 6 October 2020 in the starting line up for the 5–0 EFL Trophy defeat against Norwich City Under 21s. His first goal for Newport was the 96th minute winner in a 1–0 League Two win against Port Vale on 21 November 2020.

When he came on as a substitute in the second leg of Newport's play-off semi-final against Forest Green Rovers on 23 May 2021, he became the oldest outfield player in play-off history. He scored a goal in the 70th minute, thus also becoming the oldest goal scorer in the play-offs. Ellison played for Newport in the League Two playoff final at Wembley Stadium on 31 May 2021 which Newport lost to his former club, Morecambe, 1–0 after a controversial 107th minute penalty.

On 26 July 2021, Ellison signed a new one-year deal to stay at Newport through the 2021–22 season. As part of the deal, he would also take up a coaching role with the club’s development squad. He was released by Newport at the end of the 2021-22 season.

Non-League
In August 2022, Ellison signed for Northern Premier League Premier Division club Warrington Rylands. On 23 September 2022, Ellison joined City of Liverpool.On his debut, he terrorised Hanley Town’s defence in an important 2-3 win, getting 2 assists and a goal.

Career statistics

References

External links

Welsh Premier League stats

1979 births
Living people
Footballers from Liverpool
English footballers
Association football wingers
Southport F.C. players
Chorley F.C. players
Conwy Borough F.C. players
Altrincham F.C. players
Leicester City F.C. players
Stockport County F.C. players
Lincoln City F.C. players
Chester City F.C. players
Hull City A.F.C. players
Tranmere Rovers F.C. players
Rotherham United F.C. players
Bradford City A.F.C. players
Morecambe F.C. players
Newport County A.F.C. players
Warrington Rylands 1906 F.C. players
City of Liverpool F.C. players
Premier League players
English Football League players
National League (English football) players
Cymru Premier players
Northern Premier League players
Association football coaches